Nectaropetalum is a genus of flowering plants belonging to the family Erythroxylaceae.

Its native range is Somalia to Southern Africa, and Madagascar.

Species
Species:

Nectaropetalum acuminatum 
Nectaropetalum capense 
Nectaropetalum carvalhoi 
Nectaropetalum eligulatum 
Nectaropetalum evrardii 
Nectaropetalum kaessneri 
Nectaropetalum lebrunii 
Nectaropetalum zuluense

References

Erythroxylaceae
Malpighiales genera